The Lake Miwok are a branch of the Miwok, a Native American people of Northern California. The Lake Miwok lived in the Clear Lake basin of what is now called Lake County.

Culture
The Lake Miwok spoke their own Lake language in the Utian linguistic group. They lived by hunting and gathering, and lived in small bands without centralized political authority. They were skilled at basketry.

Religion
The original Lake Miwok people world view included Shamanism, one form this took was the Kuksu religion that was evident in Central and Northern California, which included elaborate acting and dancing ceremonies in traditional costume, an annual mourning ceremony, puberty rites of passage, shamanic intervention with the spirit world and an all-male society that met in subterranean dance rooms. Kuksu was shared with other indigenous ethnic groups of Central California, such as their neighbors the Lake Pomo, also Maidu, Ohlone, Esselen, and northernmost Yokuts. However Kroeber observed less "specialized cosmogony" in the Miwok, which he termed one of the "southern Kuksu-dancing groups", in comparison to the Maidu and other northern California tribes.

Traditional Narratives

In their myths, legends, tales, and histories, the Lake Miwok participated in the general cultural pattern of Central California.

Mythology

Lake Miwok mythology and narratives were similar to other natives of Central and Northern California. The Lake Miwok believed in animal and human spirits, and saw the animal spirits as their ancestors. Coyote was seen as their ancestor and creator god.

Authentic Villages
The authenticated Lake Miwok villages are:

Near present-day town of Lower Lake:  Kado'(?)'-yomi-pukut  (at Cookman Ranch), Tu'bud or Tu'bul (on Asbill property toward Lower Lake),  Tule'-yomi (2–3 miles south town).
Near present-day Middletown: Laka'h-yomi (on Weldon's ranch), La'lmak-pukut (north end).
In Pope Valley: Kai-yomi-pukut, TsBk-yomi-pukut or ShOkomi (3 miles below the present-day store or town).
In Coyote Valley:"  Kala'u-yomi, Kilinyo-ke (at Eaton Ranch), Ki'tsin-pukut (at Gamble), Ole'-yomi (on the Berry place), Sha'lshal-pukut (at Ashbill),  Shandk-yomi-pukut (at Asbill).In Jerusalem Valley: Wodi'daitepi. Northern Clear Lake Basin: Kawi-yomi, (perhaps originally Pomo), Tsitsa-pukut.Other villages:  Tumi'stumis-pukut, 'Tsu'keliwa-pukut (At the 'new' Siegler swimming resort),  Wi'lok-yomi (near the present rancheria or reservation but may have been Wappo), Yawl'-yomi-pukut (North of Siegler swimming resort in a canyon),

History

The Lake Miwok were neighbors with the Pomo, Coast Miwok and Wappo people. A percentage of the Lake Miwok were coaxed circa 1800-1840 into the Spanish Missions along with their neighbors the Coast Miwok, particularly to the Mission San Francisco Solano in Sonoma once it was built. "The mission records show 21 baptism records exist from "Tuyeome and Oleyome indicating definite (mission) penetration by 1835 as far as the shores of Clear Lake, but not indicating wholesome conversion in that region."

The natives of Clear Lake suffered tremendous loss of life and were virtually decimated during the regional smallpox epidemic of 1837 that came from Fort Ross.

Population

In 1770 there about 400-500 Lake Miwok. In 1848 population estimated at 200, In 1850 it dropped to 100. In 1880 and 1920 it was estimated at 20.

Notable Lake Miwokans
Little documentation exists.

See also

 Fully feathered basket

Notes

External links 
Access Genealogy: Indian Tribal records, Miwok Indian Tribe
Native Tribes, Gkim'/{-m0roups, Language Families and Dialects of California in 1770 (map after Kroeber)

References 
 Access Genealogy: Indian Tribal records, Miwok Indian Tribe. Retrieved on 2006-08-01. Main source of "authenticated village" names and locations.
 Callaghan, Catherine. Lake Miwok Dictionary. University of California Publications in Linguistics, Vol. 39.
 Callaghan, Catherine. 1978. "Lake Miwok", in Handbook of North American Indians, vol. 8 (California). William C. Sturtevant, and Robert F. Heizer, eds. Washington, DC: Smithsonian Institution, 1978.  / 0160045754, pages 264-273.
 Cook, Sherburne. The Conflict Between the California Indian and White Civilization. Berkeley and Los Angeles, CA: University of California Press, 1976. .
 Kroeber, Alfred L. 1907. The Religion of the Indians of California, University of California Publications in American Archaeology and Ethnology 4:6. Berkeley, sections titled "Shamanism", "Public Ceremonies", "Ceremonial Structures and Paraphernalia", and "Mythology and Beliefs"; available at Sacred Texts Online
 Kroeber, Alfred L. 1925. Handbook of the Indians of California. Washington, D.C: Bureau of American Ethnology Bulletin No. 78. (Chapter 30, The Miwok); available at Yosemite Online Library
 Silliman, Stephen. Lost Laborers in Colonial California, Native Americans and the Archaeology of Rancho Petaluma. Tucson, AZ: University of Arizona Press, 2004. .

California Mission Indians
Native American tribes in California
History of Lake County, California
Miwok
People from Lake County, California

de:Miwok
fr:Miwok
pl:Miwok